Unified voicemail is the combination of different voicemail bearers into a single voicemail system. Using dedicated DID /DDI numbers for each mailbox, the mailbox can be used on a variety of devices and end-points. This is similar to what GSM providers use for their voicemail systems. Mobile phones and traditional analog phones need to support conditional call diversion to enjoy unified voicemail. Unified voicemail can be extended into unified messaging as already used.

Advantages 

Some telephone users have several telephone accounts, which may include home, work, mobile, and SIP numbers. Unified voicemail provides a single voicemail for several accounts.

See also
 Unified communications
 Unified messaging

Providers 
 Alcatel - provider of unified communication services.
 Avaya - provider of communication systems, applications, and services.
 Cisco - a vendor of unified messaging and telecommunications for corporate use.
  CTL - a manufacturer of unified desktop messaging solutions.
 NET - Gateway to integrate Microsoft's unified messaging into existing voice networks and legacy PBX systems.
 Nortel.
 Taridium - vendor of unified messaging and unified voicemail solutions for the enterprise
 VoxCentral - provider of unified voicemail solutions for mobile-centric consumers and business users.

References

Telecommunication services
Voicemail